Forstwald is a quarter (Stadtteil) of Krefeld, western Germany, located to the west of the main city center. It is marked by its forest landscape and more up-scale housing than other regions of Krefeld.

References

Krefeld